Randi J. Hagerman, M.D., is the medical director of MIND Institute at the University of California, Davis. She works for the pediatrics department under the division of child development and behavior. She is an internationally recognized researcher in the field of genetics of autism spectrum disorder with special focus on genomic instability. Along with her husband Paul Hagerman, she discovered the Fragile X-associated tremor/ataxia syndrome (FXTAS), a neurological disorder that affects older male and rare female carriers of fragile X.

Work 

Dr. Hagerman has written over 200 peer-reviewed articles and book chapters on neurodevelopmental disorders. Some of the specific topics of her papers include repeat expansion and the genetics of neurodevelopmental disorders (e.g. Fragile-X). She also works on an editorial board to help edit the publications Journal of Developmental and Behavioral Pediatrics and Molecular Autism.

Awards 

Jerrett Cole Award, National Fragile X Foundation, 1992
Bonfils-Stanton Foundation Award for Science including Medicine, 1993
Namesake (with Paul Hagerman), Hagerman Award for Research in FXTAS, International Association for the Study of Intellectual Deficiency, 2004
Lifetime Achievement Award, National Fragile X Foundation, 2008

Education

Education 

 M.D., Medicine, F.A.A.P., Stanford University School of Medicine, Palo Alto, California, 1975
 B.S., Zoology, UC Davis, Davis, California, 1971

Residency 

 Stanford University School of Medicine, Palo Alto, California, 1976–77
 University of California, San Diego, La Jolla, California, 1979–80

Fellowships 

 University of California, San Diego, La Jolla, California, 1978–80

Board Certifications 

 American Board of Pediatrics, 1981

Professional Memberships 
Dr. Hagerman is a devoted member of several organizations that seek to study child development.

 American Academy of Pediatrics
 American Society of Human Genetics
 International Association for the Scientific Study of Intellectual Disabilities
 National Fragile X Foundation
 Scientific Council of L'Association Mosaiques (Paris)
 Society for the Scientific Study of Behavioral Phenotype s
 Society of Developmental and Behavioral Pediatrics
 Western Society of Pediatric Research

References 

American women physicians
Autism researchers
Living people
Place of birth missing (living people)
University of California, Davis faculty
Year of birth missing (living people)
American medical researchers
21st-century American women